A peak ornament is a decorative element which may be located under the peak of eaves of a gabled building.  

For example, peak ornaments are notable features in some of the historic houses of the Noank Historic District, in the town of Groton, Connecticut.

The peak ornament is an architectural element in architecture.

See also
 Bargeboard
 Classical architecture
 Glossary of architecture

Notes

Ornaments (architecture)